Mohamed Bachar is a Niger international football player. He made his debut versus Gabon in June 2012. He also participated in the CAF Under 17 Championship in 2009.

References

External links 

1992 births
Living people
Nigerien footballers
Niger international footballers
2013 Africa Cup of Nations players
People from Agadez
Association football defenders